State Route 182 (SR 182) is a  state highway that runs west–east through northern Ben Hill County in the south-central part of the U.S. state of Georgia.

Route description
The route begins at an intersection with US 129/SR 11 north of Fitzgerald. It travels southeast to its eastern terminus at an intersection with US 319/SR 107 northeast of Fitzgerald. The route, named River Road, runs parallel to the Ocmulgee River for its entire length.

Major intersections

See also

References

External links

 Georgia Roads (Routes 181 - 200)

182
Transportation in Ben Hill County, Georgia